Pietro Correr (18 June 1707 – 4 September 1768) was an Italian politician and diplomat. Born in Venice, he belonged to the Correr family and held several government roles in the Republic of Venice, for example its ambassador to the Habsburg monarchy and the Papal States. He also worked in Constantinople, where he guided the work of the scientist Ruggero Boscovich. He died in Venice.

References

1707 births
1768 deaths
Ambassadors of the Republic of Venice to Austria
Ambassadors of the Republic of Venice to the Holy See
Pietro
18th-century Venetian people